Sharp On All 4 Corners: Corner 1 is the twenty first studio album by American rapper E-40. The album was released on December 9, 2014, by Heavy on the Grind Entertainment. The album features guest appearances from Boosie Badazz, T-Pain, Kid Ink, B.o.B, Turf Talk, Cousin Fik, Ezale, Vell, Adrian Marcel, Willie Joe, Nef the Pharaoh, Too Short, B-Legit and Otis & Shug. The album was supported by the singles "Red Cup" and "Choices (Yup)".

Sharp On All 4 Corners: Corner 2 was released the same day as this album, but as of 2022, Corner 3 and Corner 4 have not seen a release.

Singles
On August 6, 2014, the album's first single "Red Cup" featuring T-Pain, Kid Ink and B.o.B was released. On October 9, 2014, the music video was released for "Red Cup" featuring T-Pain, Kid Ink and B.o.B. On October 31, 2014, the album's second single "Choices (Yup)" was released. On April 29, 2015, E-40 released a Golden State Warriors version of "Choices (Yup)"

Commercial performance
The album debuted at number 61 on the Billboard 200 chart, with first-week sales of 11,770 copies in the United States.

Track listing

Charts

References

2014 albums
E-40 albums
Albums produced by Mike Free
Albums produced by Tha Bizness
Albums produced by Rick Rock